Anchettidurgam or Anchetty Durgam is a fort in the present day Krishnagiri district. In the 18th century the fort was under the rule of Hyder Ali and Tipu Sultan. The fort was captured by the British in July 1791.

References
Government's Krishnagiri District website

Forts in Tamil Nadu